Lady Bath may refer to:

 Rachel Bourchier, Countess of Bath
 Laura Pulteney, 1st Countess of Bath
 Anna Thynn, Marchioness of Bath
 Emma Thynn, Marchioness of Bath